Marchioness of Bath is the principal courtesy title of the wife of the Marquess of Bath.

Countesses of Bath (England, 1536-1654)

Countesses of Bath (England, 1661-1711)

Countesses of Bath (Great Britain, 1742-1764)

Marchionesses of Bath (Great Britain, 1789-present)

References

British marchionesses